This is a list of notable restaurant chains in Ireland.

Casual dining restaurants
 Camile
 The Counter
 Eddie Rocket's
 Five Guys
 Gourmet Burger Kitchen
 Hard Rock Cafe
 Harry Ramsden's
 Leo Burdock

 Mao
 Milano
 Nando's
 O'Briens Irish Sandwich Bars
 Pizza Hut
 PizzaExpress
 T.G.I. Friday's
 Upper Crust
 Wagamama
 Yo! Sushi
 Zizzi
Yeah Burgr

Coffeehouses

 AMT Coffee
 Bewley's
 Butlers Chocolate Café
 Caffè Nero
 Caffè Ritazza
 Costa Coffee
 Esquires
 Gloria Jean's
 Insomnia Coffee Company
 Starbucks

Fast-food restaurants

 Supermac's
 Abrakebabra
 Apache Pizza
 Boojum
 Burger King
 Domino's Pizza
 Five Guys
 Freshly Chopped
 Four Star Pizza
 KFC
 Krispy Kreme
 McDonald's
 Papa John's Pizza
 Subway
 Wowburger
 Ginzeng
mizzoni's pizza

See also
 Lists of restaurants

Ireland
Restaurant Chains